Parmotrema araucariarum is a species of lichen in the family Parmeliaceae. It was first described scientifically as a species of Parmelia by Austrian botanist Alexander Zahlbruckner in 1909. Mason Hale transferred it to the genus Parmotrema in 1974. The lichen has been reported from Kenya, Tanzania, and South America.

See also
List of Parmotrema species

References

araucariarum
Lichen species
Lichens described in 1909
Lichens of Africa
Lichens of South America
Taxa named by Alexander Zahlbruckner